The Cornwall Film Festival (Cornish: Gool fylm Kernow) is an annual festival, first established in 2002, which focuses on supporting and celebrating the film and media industry in Cornwall, England.  Aside from the annual festival, the organisation also engages with film-makers and audiences throughout the year by offering local and national premieres, and hosting masterclasses, workshops and discussions for everyone from the enthusiast to the professional.

The film festival has been recognised by a number of well-known individuals in the film industry, such as film critic Mark Kermode, who created a five-minute promotional video for the event in 2013.

The festival supports Cornish filmmaking in both the Cornish and English language and there is a "govynn kernewek" competition in which applicants present their idea for a film in the Cornish language, with the winners receiving financial, material and technical support for the production.

Many filmmakers who work solely in English will refer to themselves as Cornish filmmakers. Their films often make use of Cornish themes, landscapes and ways of life. Certainly the concept of a Cornish film industry exists, the term 'Oggywood' has been coined (from oggy meaning pasty and Hollywood). Similarly, there has been a Young People's Festival which runs a day prior to the main festival. This has run for the same amount of time as the main festival.

In 2014, a new director was appointed by the board to create a "sustainable creative vision" for the future of the festival.

The 2023 event is scheduled to take place in November in Falmouth.

Previous Festival Dates

Feature Films Screened

2017 
The Florida Project | Dir. Sean Baker

Even When I Fall + Q&A | Dir.Sky Neal & Kate McLarnon

The Party | Dir. Sally Potter

The Square | Dir. Ruben Östlund

Last Fisherman |

The Yukon Assignment | Pro. Charlie Fripp

Wilderness | Dir. Justin Doherty

God's Own Country | Dir. Francis Lee

Killing of a Sacred Deer | Dir. Yorgos Lanthimos

Patti Cake$ | Dir. Geremy Jasper

2018 
PREVIEW FoxTrot | Dir. Samuel Maoz

Songbird + Q&A with Dir. | Dir. Jamie Adams

On a Knife Edge + Q&A with Dir. |Dir. Jeremy Williams

PREVIEW Colette | Dir. Wash Westmoreland

Peterloo + Q&A with Dir. | Dir. Mike Leigh

The Wife | Dir.

The Eyes of Orson Welles | Dir. Mark Cousins

The Tale | Dir. Jennifer Fox

Shoplifters | Dir. Hirokazu Kore-eda

Hannah | Dir. Andrea Pallaoro

The Wrecking Season | Dir. Jane Darke (Closing Gala)

2019 
PREVIEW System crasher | Dir Nora Fingscheidt

Honeyland | Dir Tamara Kotevska, Ljubo Stefanov

Monos | Dir Alejandro Landes

Good Posture | Dir Dolly Wells

Little Monsters |Dir. Abe Forsythe

Only You + Q&A with Director | Dir. Harry Wootliff

PREVIEW Jojo Rabbit | Dir. Taika Waititi (Closing Film)

Blues Brothers | Dir. John Landis

Hedwig and the Angry Inch | Dir. John Cameron Mitchell

2021 
Petite Maman | Dir Celina Sciama

Titane | Dir Julia Ducournau

Spencer | Dir Pablo Larraín

Ali and Ava | Dir Clio Barnard

Bad Luck Banging Or Loony Porn | Dir Radu Jude

The Card Counter | Dir Paul Schrader

Memory Box | Dir Joana nHadjithomas, Khalil Joerige

Lamb | Dir Valdimar Jóhannsson

Awards
2005 Delabole Slate Audience Award Film of the Festival: Encounters, Dir: Pat Kelman Prod.: Jonty Reason on behalf of Pittot Films

2005 Delabole Slate Audience Award Student Film of the Festival: Sunday Bench, Dir: Russell Hancock

2005 Govynn Kernewek Award: Tap Tap Tap, Dir: Marie Foulston

2019 

Fellowship Awards: Rory Wilton (Actor)

Golden Chough:Mark Jenkin (Director)for Bait (2019 film)

Music Video Award: JERUSALEM (Ofer Winter, Shimon Engel)

Best Short Award: FUNFAIR (Dir. Kaveh Mazaheri)

Best Regional Short: YN Mor (Dir. Zoe Alker)

Sub Awards:

Best Scriptwriting (supported by The Writers Collective)
THE SEA Written by Cameron Richards

Highly Commended for Writing: 
FLYING LESSONS
Written, produced and directed by Laurence Donoghue

Best Actor (Supproted by WeAudition): Anna Friel: The Sea

Best Ensemble Cast: 'Yn Mor'

See also

Culture of Cornwall
List of topics related to Cornwall
Falmouth, Cornwall

References

External links
 Cornwall Film Festival official site
 https://twitter.com/CornwallFilm

 

Film Festival
Film festivals in England
Mass media in Cornwall
Festivals in Cornwall
Cornish festivals